Ernest LaCoste (August 7, 1924 - April 1993) served in the California legislature representing the 30th District. During World War II he served in the United States Army.

References

United States Army personnel of World War II
Democratic Party members of the California State Assembly
1924 births
1993 deaths